Wallis (derived from Wallace)  may refer to:

People 
 Wallis (given name)
Wallis, Duchess of Windsor
 Wallis (surname)

Places 
 Wallis (Ambleston), a hamlet within the parish of Ambleston in Pembrokeshire, West Wales, United Kingdom
 Wallis, Mississippi, an unincorporated community, United States
 Wallis, Texas, a city, United States
 Wallis and Futuna, a French overseas department
 Wallis Island, one of the islands of Wallis and Futuna
 Valais, a Swiss canton with the German name "Wallis"
 Walliswil bei Niederbipp, a municipality in the Oberaargau administrative district, canton of Bern, Switzerland
 Walliswil bei Wangen, a municipality in the Oberaargau administrative district, canton of Bern, Switzerland

Brands and enterprises 
 Wallis (retailer), a British clothing retailer
 Wallis Theatres, an Australian cinema franchise

See also 
 Wallace (disambiguation) (original form)